Roland Gross (January 13, 1909 – February 11, 1989) was an American film editor and television editor who had over 40 film and television credits during his career.

He was nominated in the category of Best Film Editing at the 17th Academy Awards for his work on the film None but the Lonely Heart.

Selected filmography

 Flight for Freedom (1943)
 Government Girl (1943)
 The Sky's the Limit (1943)
 Tender Comrade (1943)
 Nevada (1944)
 None but the Lonely Heart (1944)
 West of the Pecos (1945)
 Deadline at Dawn (1946)
 Heartbeat (1946)
 Sister Kenny (1946)
 Mourning Becomes Electra (1947)
 The Woman on the Beach (1947)
 I Married a Communist (1949)
 The Set-Up (1949)
 Stromboli (1950)
 Gambling House (1951)
 On Dangerous Ground (1951)
 The Thing from Another World (1951)
 Androcles and the Lion (1952)
 Project Moonbase (1953)
 Son of Sinbad (1955)
 The Story of Mankind (1957)
 The Deep Six (1958)
 Island of Lost Women (1959)
 Letters from Three Lovers (1973)
 Cage Without a Key (1975)

Selected television series
 The Twilight Zone-1 episode Where Is Everybody?
 Rawhide
 Voyage to the Bottom of the Sea
 Lost in Space

References

External links
 

1909 births
1989 deaths
American film editors
People from San Antonio